State Road 104 (SR 104) is a state road in the northern section of the US state of Indiana. It serves as a connector between SR 4 near Stillwell to U.S. Route 6 (US 6) in Walkerton. The highway runs parallel to a rail line in a northwest-to-southeast direction in rural LaPorte and St. Joseph counties. SR 104 dates back to the 1940s.

Route description
SR 104 begins in La Porte County at an all-way stop with SR 4 and County Road 300 South, a few miles southeast of the city of La Porte. The route heads southeast towards Walkerton, paralleling a Chicago South Shore and South Bend Railroad track . The road is two-lane rural highway,  passing through farmland with some houses. SR 104 passes through the unincorporated community of  Stillwell and crosses the Canadian National Railway. Southeast of Stillwell the highway drifts away from the Chicago South Shore and South Bend Railroad track, for a short distance, before crossing the Kankakee River. After the river SR 104 passes between the southeast end of the Chicago South Shore and South Bend Railroad track and the north end of a Norfolk Southern rail track. SR 104 continues southeast now paralleling the Norfolk Southern track and enters St. Joseph County. The route enters Walkerton and crosses the CSX Railroad track, soon after the tracks the SR 104 designation ends at US 6 (Roosevelt Road). The roadway continues southeast as Industrial Park Drive passing through the Walkerton Industrial Park Southwest.

No segment of State Road 104 in Indiana that is included in the National Highway System (NHS).  The NHS is a network of highways that are identified as being most important for the economy, mobility and defense of the nation.  The highway is maintained by the Indiana Department of Transportation (INDOT) like all other state roads in the state. The department tracks the traffic volumes along all state roads as a part of its maintenance responsibilities using a metric called average annual daily traffic (AADT). This measurement is a calculation of the traffic level along a segment of roadway for any average day of the year. In 2016, INDOT figured that lowest traffic levels were 1,163 vehicles used the highway daily from at the La Port–St. Joseph county line. The peak traffic volumes were 1,698 vehicles used the highway daily at western end SR 104.

History
SR 104 was added to the state road system between 1942 and 1945, running along its current routing between SR 4 and US 6 in Walkerton. The entire roadway was paved between 1956 and 1959. The routing of SR 104 has remained the same since.

Major intersections

References

External links

Northwest Indiana
104
Transportation in LaPorte County, Indiana
Transportation in St. Joseph County, Indiana